The Albatros Dr.II was a German prototype single-seat fighter triplane, the sole example of which flew in the spring of 1918. It was similar in many respects to the D.X biplane, employing among other features the same 145 kW (195 hp) Benz Bz.IIIbo engine and twin 7.92 mm (.312 in) machine guns.

The three pairs of wings were sharply staggered, braced by broad I-struts, and shared parallel chords. All three pairs were equipped with ailerons, which were linked by hinged struts.

Specifications (Dr.II)

References

Further reading

 

Dr.II
1910s German fighter aircraft
Single-engined tractor aircraft
Triplanes
Aircraft first flown in 1918